Air Chief Marshal Sir John Romney Day,  (born 15 July 1947) is a retired senior Royal Air Force commander and a military advisor to BAE Systems.

Early life and education
John Day was born in England in 1947, however during the first nine years of his life, he spent a considerable amount of time in north east India where his father worked as a tea planter. He was educated at The King's School, Canterbury and at Imperial College London from where he graduated with a degree in aeronautical engineering. During his time at Imperial, Day received an RAF sponsorship and he was a member of the London University Air Squadron.

RAF career
Following initial officer training and flying training, Day was posted to RAF Odiham flying the Wessex helicopter. He went on to command No. 72 Squadron, flying Wessex helicopters, in Northern Ireland in 1983, and returned to Odiham as Station Commander.

Day attended the Royal College of Defence Studies in 1990 and then took up the post of Director of Air Force Plans and Programmes at the Ministry of Defence. On promotion to air vice marshal in 1994, Day was appointed Air Officer Commanding No. 1 Group. In 1997 he was made Deputy Chief of the Defence Staff (Commitments) and Director of Operations for all the United Kingdom's operations (including the Kosovo campaign and operations over Iraq). In 2000, Day was appointed Air Member for Personnel and Commander-in-Chief Personnel and Training Command. In 2001, he was appointed Commander-in-Chief Strike Command.

He retired from the Royal Air Force in 2003 and joined BAE Systems as their Senior Military Adviser.

BAE controversy
Day became a senior military adviser to BAE Systems in 2003. The independent watchdog monitoring the movement of officials to companies recommended that he should wait a year before taking up his new BAE job, due to his history as head of RAF Strike Command. The committee warned that Day "had been involved with Air Force Board decisions which would have a direct bearing on the MoD's business with BAE". Controversially Tony Blair then personally overruled the watchdog, saying that it was "in the national interest" to let Day move to the firm.

Chinook helicopter crash Board of Inquiry
In 1995, following the Chinook Helicopter Crash on the Mull of Kintyre, Day was the Reviewing Officer of the Board of Inquiry which had failed to find a cause of the accident.  Despite a lack of Accident Data Recorder and Cockpit Voice Recorder, Day concluded that pilot error was the cause of the crash and found the pilots guilty of gross negligence. Following a subsequent Scottish Fatal Accident Inquiry and House of Commons Public Accounts Committee report, a House of Lords Select Committee was appointed to consider all the circumstances surrounding the crash and unanimously concluded "that the reviewing officers were not justified in finding that negligence on the part of the pilots caused the aircraft to crash".

References

|-

|-

|-

|-

1947 births
Knights Commander of the Order of the Bath
Living people
Officers of the Order of the British Empire
Royal Air Force air marshals
Graduates of the Royal College of Defence Studies
Alumni of Imperial College London
BAE Systems people
People educated at The King's School, Canterbury